The MasterCard International Pro-Am was a golf tournament on the LPGA Tour from 1984 to 1987. It was played at several different courses in Westchester County, New York.

Tournament locations

Winners
1987 Val Skinner
1986 Cindy Mackey
1985 Muffin Spencer-Devlin
1984 Sally Quinlan

References

External links
Westchester Hills Golf Club
Knollwood Country Club
Ridgeway Country Club

Former LPGA Tour events
Golf in New York (state)
Sports in New Rochelle, New York
Recurring sporting events established in 1984
Recurring sporting events disestablished in 1987
1984 establishments in New York (state)
1987 disestablishments in New York (state)
History of women in Washington (state)